The 2018 Southeastern Louisiana Lions football team represented Southeastern Louisiana University in the 2018 NCAA Division I FCS football season. The Lions were led by first-year head coach Frank Scelfo and played their home games at Strawberry Stadium. They were a member of the Southland Conference. They finished the season 4–7, 4–5 in Southland play to finish in a tie for eighth place.

Previous season
The Lions finished the 2017 season 6–5, 6–3 in Southland play to finish in fifth place.

On January 19, head coach Ron Roberts resigned to become the defensive coordinator at Louisiana. He finished at Southeastern Louisiana with a six-year record of 42–29.

Preseason

Preseason All-Conference Teams
On July 12, 2018, the Southland announced their Preseason All-Conference Teams, with the Lions having four players selected.

Defense First Team
 Juwan Petit-Frere – Jr. KR

Offense Second Team
 Marcus Cooper – So. RB
 Alfred Beverly – Jr. OL

Defense Second Team
 Tamarcus Russell – Sr. LB

Preseason Poll
On July 19, 2018, the Southland announced their preseason poll, with the Lions predicted to finish in fifth place.

Roster

Schedule

Source:

Game summaries

at Louisiana–Monroe

at LSU

Central Arkansas

at Lamar

Northwestern State

at Incarnate Word

Houston Baptist

Abilene Christian

at Sam Houston State

McNeese State

at Nicholls

References

Southeastern Louisiana
Southeastern Louisiana Lions football seasons
Southeastern Louisiana Lions football